The following is a chronological list of Brazilian classical composers:

Baroque
 António José da Silva (1705–1739)

Classical
 José Joaquim Emerico Lobo de Mesquita (1746–1805)
 Francisco Gomes da Rocha (1746–1808)
 André da Silva Gomes (1752–1844)
 Marcos Coelho Neto (1763–1823)
 José Maurício Nunes Garcia (1767–1830)

Romantic
 Damião Barbosa de Araújo (1778–1856)
 Elias Álvares Lobo (1834–1901)
 Antônio Carlos Gomes (1836–1896)
 Brasílio Itiberê da Cunha (1846–1913)
 Chiquinha Gonzaga (1847–1935)
 Leopoldo Miguez (1850–1902)
 Henrique Oswald (1852–1931)
 Ernesto Nazareth (1863-1934)
 Alexandre Levy (1864–1892)
 Alberto Nepomuceno (1864–1920) 
 Antônio Francisco Braga (1868–1945)

Modern/Contemporary
 Zequinha de Abreu (1880–1935)
 Heitor Villa-Lobos (1887–1959)
 Ernani Braga (1888–1948)
 Luciano Gallet (1893–1931)
 Oscar Lorenzo Fernández (1897–1948)
 Francisco Mignone (1897–1986)
 Radamés Gnattali (1906–1988)
 Mozart Camargo Guarnieri (1907–1993)
 Walter Smetak (1913–1984)
 César Guerra-Peixe (1914–1993)
 Cláudio Santoro (1919–1989)
 Gilberto Mendes (1922–2016)
 Osvaldo Lacerda (1927–1990)
 Rogério Duprat (1932–2006)
 Jocy de Oliveira (born 1936)
 Willy Corrêa de Oliveira (born 1938)
 Marlos Nobre (born 1939)
 Ricardo Tacuchian (born 1939)
 Jorge Antunes (born 1942)
 José Antônio de Almeida Prado (born 1943)
 Marisa Rezende (born 1944)
 Vânia Dantas Leite (born 1945)
 Ronaldo Miranda (born 1948)
 Ernani Aguiar (born 1950)
 José Carlos Amaral Vieira (born 1952)
 Paulo Costa Lima (born 1954)
 Sílvio Ferraz (born 1959)
 Kilza Setti (born 1965)
 Marcos Balter (born 1974)
 
Brazilian
Composers